Moulsari Avenue  is a station of the Rapid Metro Gurgaon opened in November 2013. It is owned by Haryana Mass Rapid Transport Corporation Limited (HMRTC) and operated by Delhi Metro Rail Corporation (DMRC). Earlier it was operated by Rapid Metro Gurgaon Limited (RMGL).

The station was named after Indian handset manufacturing company Micromax Informatics under corporate branding of stations, but its rights expired in 2019. This metro station is well connected to DLF industrial city and the headquarters of many MNCs. It's the nearest metro station for Ambience Mall, Gurgaon.

Connections

Bus transport service Gurugaman Route No 112 has also been availed by the chief minister of Haryana, Manohar Lal Khattar, from Haryana Vidyut Prasaran Nigam Sector 55-56 to Krishna Chowk Palam Vihar, which also includes Mircomax Moulsari Avenue Metro Station as a bus stop.

References

External links
 
 

Rapid Metro Gurgaon stations
Railway stations in Gurgaon district
Micromax Mobile
Railway stations opened in 2013
2013 establishments in Haryana